The electoral district of Macedon is an electoral district of the Victorian Legislative Assembly. It was created in 2002, replacing the abolished electorate of Gisborne. It was won at that election by Joanne Duncan, the former member for Gisborne. She was re-elected in 2006 and 2010, and retired at the 2014 election, at which she was succeeded by Labor candidate Mary-Anne Thomas.

Members for Macedon

Election results

See also
 Parliaments of the Australian states and territories
 List of members of the Victorian Legislative Assembly

References

External links
 Electorate profile: Macedon District, Victorian Electoral Commission

2002 establishments in Australia
Electoral districts of Victoria (Australia)
Shire of Macedon Ranges
Mount Alexander Shire
Shire of Hepburn
Shire of Moorabool